The Dark Side is the third studio album by power metal band DarkSun, which is the English version of El Lado Oscuro, the album was released in September 2007. The Dark Side and was released in September 2007 through FC Metal Recordings. The critics were as good as the Spanish version, like "the album can be defined with one word: brilliant!". The band collaborated on Rage's album Speak of the Dead, with a Spanish version of the song "Full Moon" entitled "La Luna Reine," which appeared as a bonus track. Just after the release of The Dark Side drummer Rafael Yugueros left DarkSun to form part of power metal band WarCry replacing former drummer Alberto Ardines. Yugueros had already worked with WarCry on their 1997's demo Demon 97. The band re-recruited Daniel Cabal who worked on what would become the band's new album Libera Me. On the summer of 2008 DarkSun announced that Cabalwas leaving the band, all these occurred in a professional and friendly way from both parties. On the same announcement the band presented new drummer Jose Ojeda, who had performed drums on Spanish bands like Rivendel Lords, Killian, among others.

Track listing
Invocation 
The Dark Side  
A Hero Reborn 
Slaves of Fear 
Blood Brothers 
Prisoners of Fate  
Echoes of the Past  
Elegy I, confrontation 
Elegy II, light between the darkness 
Elegy III, agony 
Legend

Members 
Dani González - vocals, guitars 
Tino Hevia - guitars
Pedro Junquera - bass
Víctor Fernández - keyboards
Rafael Yugueros - drums

References

External links
 DarkSun's Website

2007 albums
DarkSun albums